Mungeli is a city and a Municipal Council in Mungeli district in the Indian state of Chhattisgarh. The pin code of Mungeli is 495334.

Demographics
As of 2001 India census, Mungeli had a population of 1,08,387.

References

Cities and towns in Mungeli district